Pakistan participated in the 2010 Asian Para Games–First Asian Para Games in Guangzhou, China from 13 to 19 December 2010. Athletes from Pakistan won total four medals (including two gold), and finished at the 13th spot in a medal table.

References

Nations at the 2010 Asian Para Games
2010 in Pakistani sport